The Phantom Bullet is a 1926 American silent Western film directed by Clifford Smith and starring Hoot Gibson. It was produced by Carl Laemmle and distributed by Universal Pictures.

Cast
 Hoot Gibson as Chick Farlane
 Eileen Percy as Jane Terrill
 Allan Forrest as Don Barton
 Pat Harmon as Bill Haynes
 Nelson McDowell as Zack Peters
 William H. Turner as Judge Terrill
 John T. Prince as Tom Farlane, Sr.
 Pee Wee Holmes as Short
 Rosemary Cooper as Dolores

Preservation status
 The film is preserved at the Library of Congress and UCLA Film and Television Archive.

References

External links
 
 

1926 films
Universal Pictures films
1926 Western (genre) films
American black-and-white films
Films directed by Clifford Smith
Silent American Western (genre) films
1920s American films
1920s English-language films